Rìgano is a Sicilian surname, which came from Sicilian word rìganu (oregano). Riganò is a surname mostly from southern Calabria, Italy. Another surname, Rigani, also derived from marjoram (oregano).

Notables 
Rìgano, Riganò or Rigano may refer to:
 Christian Riganò, Italian football manager and former professional footballer, born in Sicily, Italy
 Joseph Rigano, American character actor
 Cliff Rigano, a member of the music band Dry Kill Logic

See also
 Origanum onites

References

Italian-language surnames